The Demi-Gods and Semi-Devils is a Chinese television series adapted from Louis Cha's novel Demi-Gods and Semi-Devils. It is produced by the companies Zhejiang Hua Ce Media and Dong Yang Da Qian Media, and directed by Hong Kong television series director Lai Shui-ching. Filming started on 10 November 2012. The series was first aired on Hunan TV on 22 December 2013.

Cast

 Wallace Chung as Qiao Feng / Xiao Feng
 Kim Ki-bum as Duan Yu
 Han Dong as Xuzhu
Zhang Meng as Wang Yuyan
 Jia Qing as A'zhu / A'zi
 Zong Fengyan as Murong Fu
 Mao Xiaotong as Zhong Ling
 Zhao Yuanyuan as Mu Wanqing
 Canti Lau as Duan Zhengchun
 Viann Zhang as Kang Min
 Alec Su as Wuyazi
 Alyssa Chia as Li Qiushui
 Gao Yuanyuan as Li Qiushui's sister (Li Biyun)
 Jin Ming as Tianshan Tonglao
 Wang Jianxin as Yelü Hongji
 Lu Yong as Jiumozhi
 Wang Gang as Ding Chunqiu
 Liu Chao as You Tanzhi
 Bryan Leung as Xiao Yuanshan
 Feng Jingao as Murong Bo
 Eddy Ko as Sweeper Monk
 Du Yuming as Duan Yanqing
 Lin Yizheng as Yue Laosan
 Meng Xia as Ye Erniang
 Ji Wei as Yun Zhonghe
 Yan Qingyu as Dao Baifeng
 Sylvia Cheung as Ruan Xingzhu
 Florence Tan as Gan Baobao
 Shu Yan as Qin Hongmian
 Lai Shui-ching as Wang Jiantong
 Hua Jiao as A'bi
 Li Yuan as Feng Bo'e
 Hou Jie as Bao Butong
 Wang Kun as Zhu Danchen
 Wang Zhengjia as Chu Wanli
 Liu Simeng as Granny Ping
 Sun Lufei as Granny Rui
 Ng Wah-sun as Quan Guanqing
 Hugo Ng as Zhong Wanchou
 Zhang Mingming as Zhuo Bufan
 Chen Zihan as Xiao Yuanshan's wife
 Gongsun Min as Xuanci
 Wang Yahui as Princess Yinchuan (Meng Gu)
 Guo Kaimin as Duan Zhengming
 Wang Xuanyu as Li Qingluo (Madam Wang)
 Min Zheng as Ma Dayuan
 Gao Yuqing as Bai Shijing
 Wu Huaxin as Quan Guanqing
 Han Zhenhua as Su Xinghe
 Shen Baoping as Huangmei

External links
  The Demi-Gods and Semi-Devils official weibo on Sina.com
 

2013 Chinese television series debuts
2014 Chinese television series endings
Chinese wuxia television series
Works based on Demi-Gods and Semi-Devils
Television series set in the Northern Song
Television series set in the Liao dynasty
Television series set in the Western Xia
Television shows based on works by Jin Yong
Hunan Television dramas
Television series by Huace Media